Maskette (1906–1930) was an American Thoroughbred Hall of Fame racehorse who never lost a race against other fillies.

Background
Bred by James R. Keene at his Castleton Farm near Lexington, Kentucky, Maskette was trained by future Hall of Fame inductee James G. Rowe Sr.

Racing career
Although she did not begin racing until late in the summer of 1908, the New York based two-year-old was nonetheless the top filly in the U.S. that year. Of her six starts, she finished second once and won the other five races, including setting a track record for the Saratoga Race Course in winning the Spinaway Stakes, a premier event of the racing season for juvenile fillies. The most important win of Maskette's racing career came in the 1908 Futurity Stakes at Sheepshead Bay Race Track. She defeated both male and female competition in the Futurity which for decades was the richest and most prestigious race in the United States.

The leading filly again at age three, Maskette repeated with five wins and a second in six starts. Of her several major stakes race wins, she captured the Pierrepont Handicap against colts. At age four, she won two of five starts that included another track record, this time at Aqueduct Racetrack.

Stud record
Retired to broodmare duty at her owner's Castleton Farm near Lexington, Kentucky, after producing a filly in 1912 Maskette was sold to prominent American owner/breeder William Kissam Vanderbilt, who shipped her to his Haras du Quesnay breeding farm near Deauville in Lower Normandy, France. Maskette produced four stakes winners before her death at age twenty-four in 1930.

Honors
In 1954, Belmont Park in Elmont, New York honored her memory with the Maskette Stakes, a race for fillies & mares 3-years-old & up. In 1992, the race was renamed for its ill-fated 1990 winner, Go For Wand.
 
In 2001, Maskette was inducted into the United States' National Museum of Racing and Hall of Fame.

Pedigree

References

1906 racehorse births
1930 racehorse deaths
Racehorses bred in Kentucky
Racehorses trained in the United States
Thoroughbred family 8-h
United States Thoroughbred Racing Hall of Fame inductees